"Street Dance" is a song by American hip hop/rap act Break Machine, released as their debut single in 1983, from their album Street Dance Party (released as Break Machine in the UK). It became an international hit, topping the charts in several countries as well as peaking at number three on the UK Singles Chart. It was one of the first commercially successful hip hop songs and was produced and co-written by Jacques Morali and Henri Belolo who were also behind disco group Village People. According to a list released in 2004 by the SNEP, the song was the 86th best selling single of all time in France.

Music video
The music video features the act popping and breakdancing around the streets of New York City.

Track listings
7-inch
 "Street Dance" (Vocal) – 3:42
 "Street Dance" (Instrumental) – 3:32

12-inch
 "Street Dance" (Vocal) – 6:28
 "Street Dance" (Instrumental) – 5:06

Charts

Weekly charts

Year-end charts

Sampling
In 1998, German group Scooter sampled the song in "We Are the Greatest". In 2011, Swedish house DJ Avicii sampled the song in "Street Dancer".

References

1983 debut singles
1983 songs
European Hot 100 Singles number-one singles
Number-one singles in France
Number-one singles in Norway
Number-one singles in Spain
Number-one singles in Sweden
Sire Records singles
Songs written by Fred Zarr
Songs written by Henri Belolo
Songs written by Jacques Morali